Central Community Unit School District 3 is a unified school district located in Camp Point, a village located in Adams County, Illinois. In its entirety, Central Community Unit School District 3 is composed of Central Elementary Grade School, Central Middle School, Central Junior High School, and Central High School altogether. The current superintendent is Noah Marchand. The mascot of the district schools is the panther.

Central High School offers a variety of activities, ranging from National Honor Society to a varsity Scholastic Bowl team. The district's junior high school also sports extracurricular activities, including FCCLA and a Yearbook committee.

References

Education in Adams County, Illinois
School districts in Illinois

External links